Shelby McEwen (born April 6, 1996) is an American track and field athlete who competes in the high jump.

In 2019, he jumped 2.31 m indoor and then 2.30 m outdoor, as second at 2019 USA Track & Field Outdoor Championships, qualifying for the 2019 World Championships in Doha, where he was the first non-qualifier for final.
On May 22, 2021, he jumped 2.33 m at	Roy P. Drachman Stadium, Tucson, Arizona, the qualifying standard for the 2020 Summer Games, before finishing third with 2.30 m at the 2020 US Olympic Trials.

References

IAAF athlete’s profile

Living people
American male high jumpers
1996 births
Alabama Crimson Tide men's track and field athletes
Athletes (track and field) at the 2020 Summer Olympics
Olympic track and field athletes of the United States
People from Abbeville, Mississippi